Lieutenant General Sir John Peter Barry Condliffe Watts  (27 August 1930 – 10 December 2003) was a British Army officer who became Chief of Defence Staff for the Sultan of Oman's Armed Forces.

Military career
Educated at Westminster School, Phillips Academy in Andover, Massachusetts and the Royal Military Academy Sandhurst, Watts was commissioned into the Royal Ulster Rifles in 1951. He served with 22 Special Air Service Regiment and, as Commander of B Squadron, took part in counter-terrorism operations in Borneo in 1958 and then, as Commander of D Squadron, he took part in the regiment's successful assault on Jebel Akhdar in Oman in January 1959. The dissidents there were largely captured or dispersed and for his achievement in scaling the mountain he was awarded the MC.

He was appointed Commanding Officer of 22 Special Air Service Regiment in 1970, an instructor at the Staff College, Camberley in 1972 and Director SAS in 1975. He went on to be Commander of the Sultan of Oman's Land Forces in 1979 and Chief of Defence Staff for the Sultan of Oman's Armed Forces in 1984 before retiring in 1987.

In retirement he read history and lived in a village in Wiltshire.

Family
He was married to Mary Flynn; they had four sons and three daughters before the marriage was dissolved in 1986; he subsequently married Diana Walker.

References

1930 births
2003 deaths
British Army generals
Companions of the Order of the Bath
Graduates of the Royal Military Academy Sandhurst
Knights Commander of the Order of the British Empire
People educated at Westminster School, London
Phillips Academy alumni
Recipients of the Military Cross
Royal Ulster Rifles officers
Royal Irish Rangers officers
Special Air Service officers
British military personnel of the Indonesia–Malaysia confrontation
British Army personnel of the Malayan Emergency
British military personnel of the Cyprus Emergency
British military personnel of the Aden Emergency
Academics of the Staff College, Camberley